Tel kadayıf is a Turkish dessert commonly served during the month of Ramadan. Kadayıf noodles are used in making tel kadayıf. It is baked in the oven after nuts such as peanuts or walnuts are placed between the layers of kadayıf noodles. It is served by pouring a sugary syrup on it.

Varieties in Ottoman Cuisine 
In the first Ottoman printed cookbook, Melceü't-Tabbâhîn, there is a recipe as 
Âdi Tel Kadayıf
.

See also

 List of Middle Eastern dishes
Knafeh

References

Turkish desserts